Joseph: King of Dreams is a 2000 American direct-to-video animated biblical musical drama film. It is the first direct-to-video production from DreamWorks Animation. The film is an adaptation of the story of Joseph from the Book of Genesis in the Bible and serves as a prequel to the 1998 film The Prince of Egypt (as the biblical narrative of Joseph happens before that of Moses). Composer Daniel Pelfrey stated that the film was designed as a companion piece to The Prince of Egypt, noting that though "Joseph turned out to be very different than The Prince of Egypt, it was very challenging and rewarding".

Co-director Robert Ramirez has said that whilst the reviews for the film had "generally been very good" there was a period "when the film was not working very well, when the storytelling was heavy-handed" and "klunky".

Plot 
Joseph is the youngest and most favored of Jacob's eleven sons, regarded as a "Miracle Child" because his mother Rachel had been thought infertile (“I am a Miracle Child”). Joseph grows conceited under his father's special treatment, and his elder half-brothers resent him for being favored, although Joseph desires to be accepted amongst them ("Bloom"). One night, Joseph dreams of a pack of wolves attacking the family's flock, and the next day, the dream comes true. Another dream follows, in which Joseph sees his brothers bowing before him, to which on telling them this, they hatch a plan to get rid of him, led by Judah. They sell him to a slave trader and take his torn  coat back to their parents, convincing them that Joseph was killed by wolves. 

In Egypt, Joseph is bought by Potiphar, the captain of Pharaoh's guards ("Marketplace"), and gradually becomes his most trusted attendant, as well as befriending his beautiful niece Asenath ("Whatever Road's at Your Feet"). However, Potiphar's wife, Zuleika, attempts to seduce Joseph, who refuses her advances. Infuriated, Zuleika falsely accuses Joseph of making advances on her. Potiphar nearly has him executed, but Zuleika, feeling guilty, stops him. Though Potiphar realizes that Joseph is innocent of the crimes, he reluctantly has him thrown in prison to preserve his reputation. Joseph finds himself imprisoned alongside the Pharaoh's cupbearer and his baker and interprets their dreams, which reveal that one will be put to death and the other will return to his position at the palace. Sure enough, the baker is executed and the cupbearer is returned to his job. The cupbearer, however, forgets his promise to tell the Pharaoh about Joseph, leaving him to languish in jail. 

Meanwhile, Asenath secretly supplies food to Joseph regularly through the prison's skylight. However, she is nearly spotted by a guard while doing so one evening during a thunderstorm, and is forced to drop the basket of food, much to Joseph's anger. At his lowest point, Joseph climbs the walls of the jail to the skylight, questioning God for his misfortunes and demanding to know why everything has happened to him, before slipping, falling back down, and being knocked unconscious. Upon waking the next day, Joseph finds renewed purpose in caring for a small, dying tree, which is the only source of green in the prison, and slowly helps it grow bigger and healthier as he reflects on his past and begins to trust in God's plan again ("You Know Better Than I"). 

Soon, the Pharaoh becomes troubled by nightmares which none of his advisors can interpret. Remembering Joseph, the Pharaoh's cupbearer advises him to send the now-widowed Potiphar to retrieve him. The two share a happy reunion with Potiphar apologizing to Joseph for imprisoning him and Joseph forgiving Potiphar for it. Joseph interprets the dreams as warnings of seven years of abundance being followed by seven years of famine to come after that may wipe out Egypt, and suggests that a fifth of each year's harvest will be kept back for rationing. Impressed, the Pharaoh makes Joseph his minister and second-in-command, under the name "Zaphnath-Paaneah". In the following years, Joseph's guidance not only saves the Egyptians from starvation, but allows them to sell excess grain to their neighbors, who were also devastated by the famine. Joseph marries Asenath and has two sons, Manasseh and Ephraim, with her ("More than You Take"). 

Eventually, the sons of Jacob arrive in Egypt to buy grain due to a famine in their homeland. They do not recognize Joseph, who refuses to sell to them and accuses them of spying. The brothers offer to buy the grain with the silver they sold Joseph for 20 years before, claiming that they will need it to feed their elderly father and youngest brother. Joseph still refuses to sell them grain, and imprisons Simeon until they can prove that they have another brother to support ("Bloom (Reprise)"). They reappear with Benjamin, Jacob's twelfth son and Joseph's almost identical younger brother, born during his absence, and who is now doted upon by Jacob. Benjamin tells Joseph that Rachel has died and Jacob has been inconsolable ever since Joseph was declared dead. Simeon is released and Joseph invites the brothers to a feast. 

After the feast, Joseph has his golden chalice concealed in Benjamin's bag while no one is looking, where upon its discovery, he orders that Benjamin shall be enslaved to see how the other brothers will react, and is astonished when they offer themselves in Benjamin's place. Grief-stricken and ashamed, Judah confesses to having sold Benjamin's older brother into slavery, a crime which has haunted him and his brothers ever since for twenty years, and that they cannot return without Benjamin, as it would break their father's heart to lose another son. Shocked at and touched by their change of heart, Joseph reveals himself to them. They reconcile, and Joseph invites them to live with their wives and children in Egypt. Shortly thereafter, he is happily reunited with his father, and meets his brothers' wives and children. The Hebrews then enter Egypt, unaware of the hardships that they would have to face in later years.

Voice Cast

Additional voices

 Royce D. Applegate
 Roger Aaron Brown
 Debi Derryberry
 Murphy Dunne
 Jessica Gee
 Nicholas Guest
 Wendy Hoffman

 Luisa Leschin
 Randall Montgomery
 Jonathan Nichols
 Bibi Osterwald
 Michelle Ruff
 Doug Stone

Production

Conception and development

Development for Joseph started while The Prince of Egypt was being made, so the same crew worked on both films, and the wide group of ministers served on both projects as consultants. Work on the film was based in Los Angeles and Canada, and nearly 500 artists contributed to the project."

Executive Producer Penny Finkelman Cox and DreamWorks employee Kelly Sooter noted the challenge in telling a Bible story faithfully yet still making it interesting and marketable: "we had to take powerful themes and tell them in a way that's compelling and accessible for all ages". They also noted that though it was destined to be a direct-to-video project from the beginning, "the quality of the animation does not suffer ... Our approach to the movie was to develop it with the same quality and storytelling that we did with [The] Prince of Egypt." Creatives involved also noted that "one of the most challenging parts of the movie was creating Joseph's dream sequences, which look like a Van Gogh painting in motion". Nassos Vakalis, who helped storyboard and animate the film, said "I had to travel a lot to Canada to see work done in a few studios that were subcontracting part of the movie". Composer Daniel Pelfrey explained, "I must say the writers and directors did a great job staying true to the story and bringing it into a presentation for a contemporary audience."

Early work
Ramirez explained the early stages of the film's production:

Screening and production troubles
Ramirez explained how things turned awry at the film screening:

Cracking the story
Ramirez explained they cracked the story by returning to the basics of storytelling.

Casting and approach to characters
Mark Hamill, who was cast as Judah, Joseph's elder brother, explained that the choices he made regarding his character:

Ramirez explained one of the main themes in the film by analyzing how Joseph reacts upon seeing his brothers for the first time after they sold him into slavery:

Jodi Benson was thrilled to be cast as Joseph's wife, Asenath, after seeing the work that had been done with Moses in The Prince of Egypt. Benson didn't audition for the part, and was instead offered it. Unlike some of the other characters, she provides both the speaking and singing voices in her role. It took twelve days to record her lines, and the only other voice actor she worked with was the singing voice for Joseph, David Campbell. Benson explained her character is the "voice of reason and the voice of trying to do the right thing to reconcile [Joseph] with his brothers". Her character was given a much larger role than what is presented in The Holy Bible.

Music

Score
All songs were produced and arranged by Danny Pelfrey, and he also composed the score. Hans Zimmer, the composer for The Prince of Egypt, had approved of Pelfrey taking over his role after the latter, a relative unknown at the time, did a couple of interviews at DreamWorks. Pelfrey explained "Through the process [Zimmer] gave me input as to what they like to hear, mostly through the arranging and production of the songs. After that he got too busy but he gave me the foundation and communication skills I needed to successfully complete the project". After receiving the job, Pelfrey read as many different translations of the original Bible text as he could, to find story nuances that he could incorporate. In regard to his collaboration with DreamWorks, he said "Before starting the input was pretty sketchy, but it was an ongoing process with lots of dialog with writers, producers and directors along the way. Jeffery Katzenberg always ultimately approved everything. He was directly involved with the entire process." He also explained "I had never done a musical before ... [and Zimmer] helped me incorporate the sounds from Prince of Egypt as well as guided me in the song production".

Pelfrey used choral choirs sparingly in his score, with notable examples being "a small female group in the beginning for what I was calling God's theme, and in the big scene at the end, which was the reunion of Joseph, his brothers and Jacob, his father". This was because the effect reminded him of angels, adding "I also I think it was more appropriate to the sonic tapestry and created a more uplifting feeling". He described his musical style in the film as "World/Orchestral", noting that the instruments used were more regional than specifically Egyptian, incorporating: "Duduk, Ney, Rebaba, Ban-Di, Bansuri, Moroccan Flute, Zampona, and a great variety of percussion including Djmbe, Darabuk, Dholak, Udu, etc etc". In regard to using instrumentation from an inaccurate historical context, he said "I always thought ... that the exact historical and geographical use of the instruments is not as important as the evocative or dramatic effect ... So, I didn't really concern myself too much with 'right place, right time'. A temp-track was made for the score, though Dreamworks "were not too attached to it"; some parts were tracked with "Fantasia on a Theme by Thomas Tallis" by Vaughan Williams.

Pelfrey said "Since I had never done a musical before, it was interesting to note the difference between producing these songs as opposed to doing a record. In a musical, the songs advance the story and I had to help that process, as well as make the songs belong to the fabric of the film and the palette of the score. Although this was animation, it certainly did not call for a cartoon approach, due to the depth of the story. The film needed more of a live-action treatment to the score. "Joseph: King of Dreams also allowed me to work with the best producers in the business and helped make this a very successful experience both personally and professionally." He explained "[Lucas Richman] is the reason the Symphonic Suite from Joseph was created. He contacted me about wanting to present it in a concert he was doing in Knoxville where he is the conductor and music director, so I created the suite especially for them. He has created a vibrant and thriving orchestra there and they were all very welcoming to me." It was performed in LA by the Los Angeles Jewish Symphony in August 2010.

Songs
A soundtrack was not released with the film.

Release
As the first and only DreamWorks Animation direct-to-video film, Joseph: King of Dreams was released by DreamWorks Home Entertainment on VHS and DVD on November 7, 2000. Special features included "Sing-a-long songs, storybook read-a-long programming, an interactive trivia game, and printable activity and coloring sheets". The film was released by 20th Century Fox Home Entertainment on Blu-ray on May 13, 2014, as part of a triple film set, along with DreamWorks Animation's The Road to El Dorado (2000) and Sinbad: Legend of the Seven Seas (2003). The film was re-released by Universal Pictures Home Entertainment on DVD on February 1, 2018 without the DreamWorks Animation Home Entertainment label and again on June 5, 2018 under the DreamWorks Animation Home Entertainment label.

The direct-to-video film was "made available to Christian retailers, but mainly will be sold in traditional retailers such as Walmart and Target and video stores". The sale success of Joseph was to some degree influence whether more animated Bible stories would be released by DreamWorks.

Book tie-ins
Nashville publisher Tommy Nelson, the kids division of the Christian publishing company Thomas Nelson Inc., partnered DreamWorks to publish four companion book titles based on the film, and has exclusive publishing rights to Joseph ("a read-along tape, a sticker storybook, a 48-page hardcover storybook with illustrations from the film, and a smaller hardcover storybook which retells the story of Joseph"). One of them, My Sticker Storybook: Joseph and his Brothers (published 1 Nov 2000) was a sticker storybook that followed the plot Joseph, and was written by Dandi Daley Mackall. The 48-page storybook (published 1 Nov 2000, and sometimes subtitled "Classic Edition") featured images from the film, a retelling by Mackall, and was a "stand-alone book, as well as a splendid companion to the video", also written by Mackall. Joseph, King of Dreams: read-along (8 Mar 2001) was a full-color storybook and accompanying cassette which "capture[d] all the emotional and dramatic high points". Written by Catherine McCafferty, it included the song "Better Than I" and dialogue from the film. A fourth book was published as well.

Critical response

While praising the film's merits including animation, storytelling, and music, much of the criticism came with comparing it negatively to its theatrically released predecessor The Prince of Egypt. The song You Know Better Than I was singled out for praise by numerous critics, as were the van Gogh-inspired dream sequences. Many noted that the animated hieroglyph effects were similar to those from Prince, and suggested that the film stuck closer to the Bible source material than the previous film had.

DecentFilmsGuide gave the movie a B for Overall Recommendability and 3/4 stars for Artistic/Entertainment Value, writing "Artistically, the best thing about Joseph: King of Dreams is the visionary animation work in the dream sequences ... I caught my breath at the first glimpse of these dreams, which look like living, flowing Van Goghs". However it wrote "Joseph: King of Dreams is not remotely in the same class as The Prince of Egypt. [It] is much more a children's movie". It said the songs "while cheerful and uplifting, are generally unmemorable", and described the animation as "fine but not wonderful". It noted that "once one stops making unfair comparisons to a theatrical film made on a much bigger budget, Joseph: King of Dreams is very much worthwhile on its own more modest terms". Nevertheless, the review complimented the "ominous tune' Marketplace, and said "In one small way, Joseph: King of Dreams even outshines the earlier film: The spirituality of its signature song, You Know Better Than I, is much more profound than anything in the more mainstream "There Can Be Miracles". DVD Verdict wrote "Joseph: King of Dreams will shatter any expectations you may have about direct-to-video animated features. This is no halfhearted attempt to cash in on the success of The Prince of Egypt, but is instead a fully realized and carefully crafted story of its own. This film could easily have been released theatrically, although its running time is maybe just a bit short for that", praising its animation, music, and storytelling. PluggedIn wrote "while not as eye-popping as Prince of Egypt, [the film] is impressive for a direct-to-video title. Artfully executed dream sequences. Uplifting songs. It also takes fewer liberties than Prince of Egypt did". Lakeland Ledger said "At its best, the story communicated the sense of desperation and yearning that make up the tale and provides a sense of the emotions that underscore the story". Jan Crain Rudeen of Star-News wrote "As with Prince of Egypt, the best part of Joseph for me was the discussion it sparked afterward with my kids".

The Movie Report gave the film 3/4 stars, writing "while clearly not on the level of that 1998 classic, it is a solid piece of work that is about on par with the SKG's spring theatrical release The Road to El Dorado"... Joseph is a new technical benchmark for straight-to-tape animated features, putting Disney's chintzy home video efforts to shame. It added "Bucchino's work is downright forgettable; the only song making the slightest inkling of an impression is Joseph's--and the film's--central number, Better Than I". ChristianAnswers.net gave the film 4/5 stars, writing "Although the visual effects were not as outstanding as in The Prince of Egypt, the storyline does stay closer to the biblical version". The site added "The music was enjoyable, especially the song Better Than I". "CommonSenseMedia rated the film 3/5 stars, writing "The animation is accomplished. Particularly compelling are the dream sequences, which almost look like animated Van Gogh paintings", however noting "it lacks [The Prince of] Egypt'''s poignant tunes and powerful storytelling". The Los Angeles Times wrote "with its beautiful, big-screen quality, flowing animation and striking computer-generated imagery--and with its dignity and heart--is a fine telling of the biblical story". Variety said "King of Dreams has just as much cross-generational appeal as its predecessor, and doesn't make the mistake of skewing primarily toward moppets. To put it another way: This is family entertainment in the best sense of the term, for which many families will be immensely grateful."

Accolades

|-
| 2000
| "Better Than I"
| Video Premier Award for Best Song
| 
|-
| 2001
| Joseph: King of Dreams| Silver Angel Award for Feature Film
| 
|-
| 2001
| Joseph: King of Dreams''
| Annie Award for Outstanding Achievement in an Animated Home Video Production
| 
|-
| 2001
| Penney Finkelman Cox (executive producer)Steve Hickner (executive producer)Jeffrey Katzenberg (executive producer)Ken Tsumura (producer)
| DVD Exclusive Video Premiere Award for Best Animated Video Premiere
| 
|-
| 2001
| Eugenia Bostwick-SingerMarshall GoldbergRaymond SingerJoe Stillman 
| DVD Exclusive Video Premiere Award for Best Screenplay
| 
|-
| 2001
| Ben Affleck (voice)Luc Chamberland (animation director: Joseph) 
| DVD Exclusive Video Premiere Award for Best Animated Character Performance
| 
|-
| 2001
| Rob LaDucaRobert C. Ramirez
| DVD Exclusive Video Premiere Award for Best Directing
| 
|-
| 2001
| Daniel Pelfrey
| DVD Exclusive Video Premiere Award for Best Original Score
| 
|}

See also
 List of films featuring slavery

Notes

References

External links

 
 
 
 

2000 films
2000 animated films
2000s American animated films
2000 direct-to-video films
Christian animation
American children's animated adventure films
American children's animated drama films
American children's animated musical films
Musicals based on the Bible
Films based on the Book of Genesis
Direct-to-video prequel films
DreamWorks Animation animated films
DreamWorks Pictures films
Films produced by Jeffrey Katzenberg
Films about Christianity
Films set in ancient Egypt
Film spin-offs
Cultural depictions of Joseph (Genesis)
The Prince of Egypt
Articles containing video clips
Religious drama films
Films with screenplays by Joe Stillman
2000s English-language films
American prequel films